The Snow Arena is an indoor ski slope  in Druskininkai, Lithuania. It was opened on August 26, 2011.

The indoor ski area is divided into two segments: terrain park and ski slope.

Snow at Snow Arena is made by using PowderStar Series technology. Water and air are the only ingredients of the snow with no chemical or bacteriological additives used. The interior temperature of the hall, which is open all year round, is kept at a constant −2 to −4 °C (28.4 to 24.8 °F).

There are two ski lifts in the Snow Arena: a platter lift and a chair lift. There is also a Magic carpet (ski lift) for the beginner slope. 
Snow Arena offers ski rentals and lessons with the skiing school established at the arena, offers a wide range of programs for all abilities and offers group bookings for schools and businesses. It also has a small store that sells gloves, helmets and socks and offers a range of off-snow services, including four restaurants and two licensed bars.

Cost of arena is estimated to be around €30 million.

Notable visitors 

President of the Republic of Lithuania Dalia Grybauskaite opened Snow Arena in August 2011.

Members of the Italian National Skiing Team Denise Karbon, Manuela Mölgg and Sabrina Franchini coached by Livio Magoni were training for the World Cup at Snow Arena in November 2013.

References

External links 
 Official website (English)
 Official website (Lithuanian)

Indoor ski resorts
Sports venues in Lithuania
Druskininkai
Buildings and structures in Alytus County